Triebold Paleontology Incorporated (TPI) is a company based in Woodland Park, Colorado, United States providing fossil-related goods and services.  TPI is headquartered in the Rocky Mountain Dinosaur Resource Center.  Subsidiary companies of TPI include the traveling exhibitions company, Embedded Exhibitions, LLC, Dinosaur Sanctuary, and the Rocky Mountain Dinosaur Resource Center.

History
Triebold Paleontology Incorporated was established in 1989 and is headed by Michael Triebold.  The traveling exhibition, Savage Ancient Seas, was created and hosted in 2000 and Triebold started a subsidiary company to put its traveling exhibition business under a separate brand, Embedded Exhibitions, in 2001.  In 2004, the Rocky Mountain Dinosaur Resource Center was opened as the world's first intentionally temporary fossil repository, TPI's new headquarters and as a natural history museum serving around 100,000 visitors annually.

Services
Triebold Paleontology Incorporated supplies real and replicated fossil specimens to museums and collectors.  Leases on over 30 private localities rich in Late Cretaceous fossils are held and regularly prospected by TPI paleontologists.  Triebold Paleontology Incorporated provides every fossil-related service in the museums service industry including molding and casting, preparation and restoration, prospecting and collecting, and mounting and remounting fossils and fossil casts.

See also
 Asteroid 45519 Triebold

References
Triebold, M. (1997). "The Sandy site: Small dinosaurs from the Hell Creek Formation of South Dakota." in Wolberg, D., Stump, E. and Rosenberg, G. (eds); Dinofest International: Proceedings of a Symposium. Arizona State University Academy of Natural Science. 245-48
Campagna, Tony (2000). "The PT interview: Michael Triebold". Prehistoric Times 40: 18–19.
FRIEDMAN, M., K. SHIMADA, L. MARTIN, M. J. EVERHART, J. LISTON, A. MALTESE, AND M. TRIEBOLD. 2010. 100-million-year dynasty of giant planktivorous bony fishes in the Mesozoic seas. Science, 327:990-993.

External links
Official website
Fossil sales website
Traveling exhibits website

Paleontology in Colorado
Companies based in Colorado
Fossil trade in the United States